Dallas M. Fitzgerald (August 13, 1876 – May 9, 1940) was an American motion picture director and producer, primarily in the silent era. He is also known as the writer of the Frank Buck film serial Jungle Menace.

Early life
Fitzgerald born in La Grange, Kentucky to William Fitzgerald, a traveling salesman, and Jasie Fitzgerald.

Career
Fitzgerald was a director of low-budget films. He began acting in films in 1916. He was hired by Greater Pictures Corp. in 1917. He directed mostly action melodramas believing, according to a 1921 interview, that the "public likes pictures made outdoors." In the late 1920s, Fitzgerald became a producer of the films Wilful Youth (1927) and Golden Shackles (1928) through low-budget Peerless Pictures, which had been founded by Jules Brulatour. In the sound era, Fitzgerald wrote screenplays for such serials as The Black Coin (1936), The Clutching Hand (1936), and The Great Adventures of Wild Bill Hickok (1938). He died in Los Angeles in 1940.

Partial filmography
The Open Door (1919)
Chains of Evidence (1920) (*note:Library of Congress)
 The Price of Redemption (1920)
 Blackmail (1920)
Cinderella's Twin (1920)
The Off-Shore Pirate (1921)
Puppets of Fate (1921) (*note:Cinemateca Brasileira-Sao Paulo)
Life's Darn Funny (1921)
Big Game (1921)
The Match-Breaker (1921)
The Infamous Miss Revell (1921)
Playing with Fire (1921)
The Guttersnipe (1922)
Her Accidental Husband (1923) (*note:Cinematheque Quebecoise-Montreal)
 After the Ball (1924)
Passionate Youth (1925) (*note:Cinemateca Brasileira, BFI Nat.l Film & Tv)
Tessie (1925)
My Lady of Whims (1925)
 The Princess on Broadway (1927) (*note:BFI Nat'l. Film & TV, incomplete)
 Woman's Law (1927)
 The Rose of Kildare (1927)
Out of the Past (1927) (*note:Bois d'Arcy)
Web of Fate (1927) (*note:Library of Congress, BFI)
Wilful Youth (1927)
 Golden Shackles (1928) (*note:Library of Congress)
The Girl He Didn't Buy (1928) (*note:1 reel survives in foreign archive)
The Lookout Girl (1928) (*note:LoC Catalog has no holdings,...but the film is out on dvd)
Jazzland (1928)
 Maizie (1933)

Work with Frank Buck
In 1937, Fitzgerald was a writer of the Frank Buck serial Jungle Menace.

References

External links

 

1876 births
1940 deaths
American male screenwriters
People from La Grange, Kentucky
Film directors from Kentucky
Screenwriters from Kentucky
Film producers from Kentucky
20th-century American male writers
20th-century American screenwriters